Juan Gelman (3 May 1930 – 14 January 2014) was an Argentine poet. He published more than twenty books of poetry between 1956 and his death in early 2014. He was a naturalized citizen of Mexico, country where he arrived as a political exile of the Military Junta.

In 2007, Gelman was awarded the Cervantes Prize, the most important in Spanish literature. His works celebrate life but are also tempered with social and political commentary and reflect his own painful experiences with the politics of Argentina.

Biography
Juan Gelman Burichson was born on May 3, 1930, in Buenos Aires Villa Crespo neighborhood to Jewish immigrants from Ukraine. As a boy he read Russian and European literature widely under the tutelage of his brother Boris.
 His father, José Gelman, was a social revolutionary who participated in
the 1905 revolution in Russia; he immigrated to Argentina, went back shortly after the Bolshevik revolution, and then returned to Argentina for good, disillusioned.

Gelman learned to read when he was three years old, and spent much of his childhood reading and playing soccer. He developed an interest in poetry at a very young age, influenced by his brother Boris, who read to him several poems in Russian, a language that the boy did not know. The experience of reading Dostoevsky's The Insulted and Humiliated (1861) at age eight made a profound impression on him.

As a young man he was a member of several notable literary groups and later became an important journalist. He also worked as a translator at the United Nations. He was always an ardent political activist. In 1975 he became involved with the Montoneros, though he later distanced himself from the group. After the 1976 Argentine coup, he was forced into exile from Argentina. In 1976, his son Marcelo and his pregnant daughter-in-law, Maria Claudia, aged 20 and 19, were kidnapped from their home. They became two of the 30,000 desaparecidos, the people who were forcibly "vanished" without a trace during the reign of the military junta. In 1990 Gelman was led to identify his son's remains (he had been executed and buried in a barrel filled with sand and cement), and years later, in 2000, he was able to trace his granddaughter, born in a backdoor hospital before Maria Claudia's murder and given to a pro-government family in Uruguay. The remains of Maria Claudia have not yet been recovered.

During his long exile, Gelman lived in Europe until 1988, then in United States and later in Mexico, with his wife, Argentinian psychologist Mara La Madrid.

In 1997, Gelman received the Argentine National Poetry Prize, in recognition of his life's work, and in 2007 the Cervantes Prize, the most important prize for Spanish-language writers. He also had a long and brilliant career as journalist, writing for the Argentinian newspaper Pagina/12 until his death.

Gelman included Uruguayan police officer Hugo Campos Hermida in a legal suit lodged in Spain for the "disappearance" of his daughter-in-law in Uruguay.

His granddaughter 
At the beginning of the 21st century, Uruguayan President Jorge Batlle Ibáñez ordered an investigation and Gelman's granddaughter was found. Macarena, who had lived as an adopted child, took the surnames of her parents and started a career as a human rights activist.

Death
Gelman died at age 83 of complications with preleukemia at his home in the Condesa neighborhood of Mexico City. His granddaughter, Macarena, flew in from Uruguay to attend the funeral. Three days of national mourning was declared by Argentina's President, Cristina Fernández de Kirchner.

Personal papers 
Juan Gelman's archive which includes drafts of writings and a collection of files he kept pertaining to his human rights investigations is available for research at the Manuscripts Division in the Department of Rare Books and Special Collections at Princeton University.

Works

Published in English translation
Unthinkable Tenderness: Selected Poems, trans.: Joan Lindgren, University of California Press, 1997
The Poems of Sidney West, trans.: Katherine M. Hedeen & Victor Rodríguez Nuñez, Salt Publishing, 2009
Between Words: Juan Gelman Public Letter, trans.: Lisa Rose Bradford, CIAL, 2010
Commentaries and Citations, trans.: Lisa Rose Bradford, Coimbra Editions, Poetry in Translation, 2011
Nightingales again, trans.: J. S. Tennant, in MPT Review, Series 3 no. 11 Frontiers, 2011
Com/positions, trans.: Lisa Rose Bradford, Coimbra Editions, Poetry in Translation, 2013

Published in Spanish

Poetry
 Violín y otras cuestiones, Buenos Aires, Gleizer, 1956.
 El juego en que andamos, Buenos Aires, Nueva Expresión, 1959.
 Velorio del solo, Buenos Aires, Nueva Expresión, 1961.
 Gotán (1956-1962), Buenos Aires, La Rosa Blindada, 1962. (Neuauflage 1996)
 Cólera Buey, La Habana, La Tertulia, 1965. (Neuauflage 1994)
 Los poemas de Sidney West, Buenos Aires, Galerna, 1969. (Neuauflage 1995)
 Fábulas, Buenos Aires, La Rosa Blindada, 1971.
 Relaciones, Buenos Aires, La Rosa Blindada, 1973.
 Hechos y Relaciones, Barcelona, Lumen, 1980.
 Si dulcemente, Barcelona, Lumen, 1980.
 Citas y Comentarios, Visor Madrid, 1982.
 Hacia el Sur, México, Marcha, 1982.
 Com/posiciones (1983-1984), Barcelona, Ediciones del Mall, 1986.
 Interrupciones I, Buenos Aires, Libros de Tierra Firme, 1986.
 Interrupciones II, Buenos Aires, Libros de Tierra Firme, 1988.
 Anunciaciones, Madrid, Visor, 1988.
 Carta a mi madre, Buenos Aires, Libros de Tierra Firme, 1989.
 Dibaxu, Buenos Aires, Seix Barral, 1994.
 Salarios del impío, Buenos Aires, Libros de Tierra Firme, 1993.
 Incompletamente, Buenos Aires, Seix Barral, 1997.
 Tantear la noche, Lanzarote, Fundación César Manrique, 2000.
 Valer la pena, Buenos Aires, Seix Barral, 2001.
 País que fue será, Buenos Aires, Seix Barral, 2004.
 Mundar, Buenos Aires, Seix Barral, 2007.
 De atrásalante en su porfía, Madrid, Visor, und Buenos Aires,  Seix Barral, 2009
 El emperrado corazón amora, Barcelona, Tusquets und Buenos Aires, Seix Barral, 2011

Anthologies
 Poemas, Casa de las Américas, La Habana, 1960. 
 Obra poética, Corregidor, Buenos Aires, 1975.
 Poesía, Casa de las Américas, La Habana, 1985.
 Antología poética, Vintén, Montevideo, (1993). 
 Antología personal, Desde la Gente, Instituto Movilizador de Fondos Cooperativos, Buenos Aires, 1993.
 En abierta oscuridad, Siglo XXI, México, 1993.
 Antología poética, Espasa Calpe, Buenos Aires, 1994. 
 De palabra (1971-1987). Prefazione di Julio Cortázar, Visor, Madrid, 1994.
 Oficio Ardiente (2005), Patrimonio Nacional y la Universidad de Salamanca.
 Fulgor del aire (2007), LOM Ediciones, Santiago del Chile
 De palabra: Poesía III (1973-1989) (2008), Visor Libros, Madrid
 Bajo la luvia ajena (2009), Seix Barral, Barcelona

Prose
 Prosa de prensa, Ediciones B, España, 1997
 Ni el flaco perdón de Dios/Hijos de desaparecidos (coautore con Mara La Madrid), Planeta, Buenos Aires, 1997
 Nueva prosa de prensa, Ediciones B Argentina, Buenos Aires, 1999
 Afghanistan/Iraq: el imperio empantanado, Buenos Aires, 2001
 Miradas, Seix Barral, Buenos Aires, 2005
 Escritos urgentes, Capital Intellectual, Buenos Aires, 2009
 Escritos urgentes II, Capital intellectual, Buenos Aires, 2010
 El ciempiés y la araña, ilustraciones de Eleonora Arroyo, Capital intellectual, México, 2011

Criticism of his works
The Reasoning behind the Act of Striking a Spent Match / Hernán Fontanet, 2019.
Juan Gelman y su tiempo: Historias, poemas y reflexiones / Hernán Fontanet, 2015.
Gelman. Un poeta y su vida / Hernán Fontanet, 2015.
Juan Gelman : esperanza, utopía y resistencia / Pablo Montanaro, 2006
La escritura del duelo en la poesía de Juan Gelman / Geneviève Fabry, 2005
El llamado de los desaparecidos : sobre la poesía de Juan Gelman / Edmundo Gómez Mango, 2004
Juan Gelman y la nueva poesía hispanoamericana / Miguel Correa Mujica, 2001
Juan Gelman : poesía de sombra de la memoria / Elena Tamargo Cordero, 2000
Acercamientos a Juan Gelman / José Bru, 2000
Palabra de Gelman : en entrevistas y notas periodísticas / Pablo Montanaro, 1998
La poesía de Gelman: cuando surgen las palabras" / Daniel Freidemberg, 1997Juan Gelman : las estrategias de la otredad : heteronimia, intertextualidad, traducción / María del Carmen Sillato, 1996Como temblor del aire : la poesía de Juan Gelman, ensayos críticos / Lilián Uribe, 1995Juan Gelman : contra las fabulaciones del mundo / Miguel Dalmaroni, 1993Conversaciones con Juan Gelman : contraderrota, Montoneros y la revolución perdida / Roberto Mero, 1987La poesía de Juan Gelman o la ternura desatada / Hugo Achugar, 1985Juan Gelman, poeta argentino'' / Beatriz  Varela de Rozas, 2004

See also

Argentine literature
Dirty War

References

External links

Todo sobre la poesía de Juan Gelman 
La bitácora de Gelman 
Poemas de Juan Gelman 
 Obras de Juan Gelman, Solo Literatura 
Speciale di EL MUNDO su Juan Gelman 
Poeticas de Gelman 
Juan Gelman por elortiba 
Juan Gelman a media voz 

1930 births
2014 deaths
Deaths from myelodysplastic syndrome
People from Buenos Aires
Argentine people of Ukrainian-Jewish descent
21st-century Argentine poets
21st-century Argentine male writers
Argentine male poets
Argentine Jews
Argentine translators
Jewish Argentine writers
Jewish poets
Argentine emigrants to Mexico
Naturalized citizens of Mexico
Premio Cervantes winners
20th-century Argentine poets
20th-century Argentine male writers
20th-century translators